Pop rap (also known as pop hip-hop, hip pop, pop hop, melodic hip-hop or melodic rap) is a genre of music fusing the rhythm-based lyricism of hip hop music with pop music's preference for melodious vocals and catchy tunes. This genre gained mainstream popularity during the 1990s, though the influences and roots of pop rap can trace back to late-1980s hip hop artists such as Run-DMC, LL Cool J, and Beastie Boys. The lyrics are often lighthearted, with choruses similar to those heard in pop music.

Characteristics
AllMusic describes pop rap as "a marriage of hip hop beats and raps with strong melodic hooks, which are usually featured as part of the chorus section in a standard pop-song structure." Pop rap also tends to have less aggressive lyrics than street-level rap music. However, some 1990s artists fused pop rap with a more aggressive attitude to defuse backlash on their own accessibility. Music journalist Wilson McBee has strongly criticized pop rap, "A pop rapper is assumed to be a sellout – someone who has compromised artistic principles in order to fit commercial expectations. Or worse, it's someone who never had any artistic principles to begin with, who's guilty of bastardizing rap's social and political traditions just to make money." McBee also then went on saying "In labeling the likes of Flo Rida and other pop rappers, we blur the distinction between a 'pop rapper' and a rapper who is just really popular. Not every rapper who has a hit is automatically a sellout or deserving of the pop rap tag." While some rappers from the 1990s with catchy hooks have been compared to pop music, McBee also said: 

Pop rap songs often have lyrical content similar to that in pop with themes such as love and relationships.

History

In the 1980s, rap artists including Run DMC and LL Cool J set up the blueprints and origins of pop rap as they suddenly broke into the mainstream. LL Cool J has been described as the very first "pop rapper" in history, when he rose to prominence on his 1985 debut album Radio. MTV has described LL Cool J's 1987 single "I Need Love" as "one of the first pop rap crossover hits". Later, rap artists such as Tone Loc, Young MC, and Fresh Prince then made party tunes and used their storytelling abilities as they became popular. During the 1990s, pop rap began to expand even more as hip hop music also began to connect strongly with dance music and R&B.

In the early 1990s, MC Hammer and Vanilla Ice broke into the mainstream with songs like "U Can't Touch This" and "Ice Ice Baby", respectively. They caused pop rap to be "derided (and, occasionally, taken to court) for its willingness to borrow" from well-known hit singles. Another important moment was the remix of Mariah Carey's 1995 song "Fantasy" with Ol' Dirty Bastard.

By the end of the 1990s and early 2000s, rappers such as Ja Rule fused gangsta rap themes with 1980s pop and soul elements; pop rap was dominated by many artists.

It then went back into the mainstream with the success of the Black Eyed Peas who had smash singles such as "Where Is the Love?" from their Elephunk album. During the late 2000s and early 2010s, many pop rap artists had emerged such as Drake, will.i.am from The Black Eyed Peas, Flo Rida, Pitbull, LMFAO, B.o.B, Nicki Minaj, Macklemore and Wiz Khalifa.

Social acceptance 
Most people who listen to pop rap do not call it pop rap, and consider it as rap. When Spotify introduced the pop rap category in 2019, Twitter users were confused as to what this 'new' genre suggested. Some users were even bewildered when Spotify classified the genre for its users and suggested that they listen to pop rap. Popular American rapper LL Cool J did not embrace the idea of labeling him as the "forefather of pop rap" and tweeted about it in April 2021.

Citations

 
Pop music genres
Hip hop genres
Fusion music genres
1980s in music
1990s in music
2000s in music
2010s in music
2020s in music